List of buildings and structures by Brazilian architect Oscar Niemeyer. From the approximately 600 projects designed by Niemeyer, only the most notable are listed below.

Early works (1930s)

1936 – Gustavo Capanema Palace, Ministry of Education and Health, Rio de Janeiro – contributed to the Le Corbusier project.
1937 – Associação Beneficente Obra do Berço (Association of Charitable Work) – created a vertical brise soleil.
1938 – Grande Hotel of Ouro Preto
1939 – Brazil’s pavilion at 1939 New York World's Fair – contributed to the Lucio Costa project.

1940s and 1950s
1940 – Church of Saint Francis of Assisi and other buildings at Pampulha in Belo Horizonte, southeastern Brazil.
1946 – Headquarters of Banco Boavista in Candelaria, Rio de Janeiro.
1946 – Colegio Cataguases (Odessa College).
1947 – United Nations Headquarters in New York City.
1947 – Centro Técnico Aeroespacial in São José dos Campos, SP
1951 – Ibirapuera Park (with landscape architect Roberto Burle Marx).
1951 – JK Building (Juscelino Kubitschek).
1951 – Edifício Copan (Copan Building) 38-story residential building in São Paulo, Brazil.
1952 – Casa das Canoas – Niemeyer’s personal home in Canoas, Rio de Janeiro.
1954 – Residência Cavanelas.
1954 – Museum of Modern Art in Caracas (Museo de Arte Moderno de Caracas) (unbuilt)
1954 – Interbau buildings project in the Hansaviertel district, part of the reconstruction of Berlin.
1954 – Montreal Building (Edifício Montreal) in São Paulo.
1955 – Califórnia Building (Edifício Califórnia) in downtown São Paulo (with Carlos Lemos).
1955 – Edifício Triângulo (Triangle Building), São Paulo.
1956 – Eiffel Building (Edifício Eiffel) located in Praça da República (São Paulo), São Paulo.
1956 – Residência Provisória do Presidente da República (Provisional Residence of the President).
1957 – Itatiaia Building (Edifício Itatiaia), in downtown Campinas, State of São Paulo
1958 – Hospital da Lagoa (Lagoa Hospital) built in Lagoa, Rio de Janeiro.

Buildings in Brasília

At Brasília, Niemeyer designed:
1956 - Residência Provisória do Presidente da República (Catetinho).
1957 – Eixo Monumental (Monumental Axis).
1957 – Palácio da Alvorada Presidential residence.
1958 – Catedral Metropolitana Nossa Senhora Aparecida (Cathedral of Brasília).
1958 – Church of Our Lady of Fatima ("Igrejinha Nossa Senhora de Fátima"/"A Igrejinha da 307/308 Sul")
1958 – National Congress of Brazil (Congresso Nacional).
1958 – Supremo Tribunal Federal or STF (Supreme Federal Tribunal) Federal Supreme Court.	
1958 – Palácio do Planalto (Palace of the Highlands) Presidential office.
1958 – Cláudio Santoro National Theater (National Theater).
1959 – Palácio do Jaburu (Palace of the Jabiru) Vice-presidential residence.
1960 – Praça dos Três Poderes (Square of the Three Powers).
1960 - Cine Brasília.
1962 – Palácio do Itamaraty (Ministry of External Relations).
1962 – Ministério da Justiça or "Palácio da Justiça" (Ministry of Justice).
1962 – Universidade de Brasília main building, the Central Institute of Science (Instituto Central de Ciências, ICC).
1965 – Aeroporto de Brasilia (Project was never built).
1985 – Panteão da Pátria e da Liberdade Tancredo Neves (Pantheon of the Fatherland and Freedom).
1986 – Casa do Cantador (Palácio da Poesia).
1987 – Memorial dos Povos Indígenas (Memorial of the Aboriginal Peoples) .
1995 – Superior Tribunal de Justiça.
2002 – Sede da Procuradoria Geral da República Brasileira (Attorney General's Office).
2006 – Cultural Complex of the Republic (Complexo Cultural da República).
Biblioteca Nacional Leonel de Moura Brizola (National Library of Brasília).
Museu Nacional Honestino Guimarães (National Museum Honestino Guimarães).
2006 – Tribunal Superior do Trabalho.
2008 – Sede da Ordem dos Advogados do Brasil.
2011 – Tribunal Superior Eleitoral
2012 – Torre de Televisão Digital (Brasília Digital Television Tower).

Exile years (1965–85) 
1962 – International Fair and Permanent Exhibition Hall, Lebanon).
1963 – University of Haifa, Israel.
1965 – Headquarters of the French Communist Party ("PCF"), in Paris.
1968 – Centro Musical, Rio de Janeiro, Brazil.
1968 – Mondadori publishing headquarters, Italy.
1968 – Civic Center of Algiers
1968 – Mosque of Algiers
1969 – University of Science and Technology - Houari Boumediene in Algeria.
1969 – University of Constantine in Constantine, Algeria
1972 – Labour council building of Bobigny, France - auditorium.
1975 – Fata Engineering Headquarters, Pianezza, Turin, Italy.
1975 – La Coupole D’Alger Arena in Chéraga, Algeria
1976 – Casino da Madeira (Pestana Casino Park) on Madeira Island, Portugal.
1980 – JK Memorial (Juscelino Kubitschek).
1981 – Leisure Island in Abu Dhabi
1981 – Cartiere Burgo Headquarters, San Mauro Torinese, Turin, Italy
1982 – Integrated Center for Public Education - CIEP public school system
1982 – Cultural Center, "The Volcano”, Le Havre
1983 – Sambadrome Marquês de Sapucaí  (Sambadrome) in Rio de Janeiro.
1983 – Praça da Apoteose (Apotheosis Square) at the end of Marquês de Sapucaí Street, Rio de Janeiro
1985 – Panteão da Liberdade e da Democracia Tancredo Neves (Pantheon of Liberty and Democracy Tancredo Neves).

Return to Brasil (1985–2012) 
1987–1989 – Latin America Memorial (Memorial da América Latina) in São Paulo
1988 – Londrina Bus Terminal (Terminal Rodoviário de Londrina) in Londrina, Paraná
1991–1996 – Niterói Contemporary Art Museum (Museu de Arte Contemporânea "MAC") in Niteroi, Rio de Janeiro
1991 – Latin American Parliament (Parlamento Latino Americano) in São Paulo
1993 – Anhembi Sambadrome (Sambódromo do Anhembi) in São Paulo
1997 – Niemeyer Way (Caminho Niemeyer) Theater, museums, restaurant, village square
1999–2005 – Ibirapuera Auditorium (Auditório do Ibirapuera) in Ibirapuera Park, São Paulo
2000–2010 – Auditorium Oscar Niemeyer Ravello, Amalfi Coast, Italy
2001–2002 – Oscar Niemeyer Museum in Curitiba, Paraná
2003–2010 – Centro Administrativo de Minas Gerais

2003 – Serpentine Gallery Pavilion in London
2004 – Itaipu Dam in Brazil
2005 – Itaipu Dam in Paraguay
2006–2011 – Oscar Niemeyer International Cultural Centre in the Principality of Asturias, Spain
2006 – Natal City Park in Natal, Rio Grande do Norte
2006–2008 – White Cape Station (Estação Cabo Branco) in João Pessoa, Paraíba
2007 – Popular Theatre of Niteroi (Teatro Popular de Niteroi) in Niteroi, Rio de Janeiro
2007 – Cultural Center (Centro Cultural em Valparaíso) in Valparaiso, Chile
2007 – University of Information Science (Universidade de Ciências e Informática) in Havana, Cuba
2008 – Puerto de La Musica in Rosário, Argentina
2008 – Parque da Cidade Dom Nivaldo Monte (city park) in Natal, Rio Grande do Norte
2008 – Caracol de Buritis in Buritis, Minas Gerais
2008 – Espaço Cultural Holoteca in Foz do Iguaçu, Paraná
2009 – Câmara Municipal de Poços de Caldas (city hall) in Poços de Caldas, Minas Gerais
2011 – Parque Dona Lindu (city park) in Recife, Pernambuco
2012 – Museum of Popular Arts of Paraíba (museum) in Campina Grande, Paraíba

References
Fundação Oscar Niemeyer Timeline, Official Website

External links

 Oscar Niemeyer's Strick House in Santa Monica
 Mondadori Headquarters
 Tripoli International Fair by Oscar Niemeyer, 360 Panorama by Melkan Bassil

 
Niemeyer, Oscar
International Style (architecture)
Modernist architecture
Modernist architecture in Brazil